Christopher or Chris Gibson may refer to:

 Chris Gibson (Australian politician) (born 1951), member of the Tasmanian House of Assembly, 1990–1992
 Chris Gibson (New York politician) (born 1964), United States Representative from New York
 Christopher Gibson (born 1992), Finnish ice hockey goaltender
 Chris Gibson, eye-witness of the Aurora (aircraft) 
Several of the Gibson baronets were called Christopher Gibson